The 1996 Belgian Air Force Hercules accident is an aviation accident that occurred on 15 July 1996 at Eindhoven Airport, the Netherlands. The disaster involved a Belgian Lockheed C-130 Hercules aircraft and resulted in the death of 34 passengers. The incident is known as the "Hercules disaster" in the Netherlands and Belgium.

Accident
At 6:02 PM local time, the transport aircraft crashed at Eindhoven Airport with a total of 41 people on board: Four Belgian crew members and 37 young members of the Fanfarekorps of the Royal Netherlands Army. As the aircraft was coming in to land at Eindhoven, it encountered a flock of birds; it overshot, but lost power and crashed into the ground; a fire broke out, which destroyed the cockpit and forward fuselage, killing 32 people on board.

The Eindhoven airfield fire service were not initially aware that the transport aircraft was carrying passengers - it was thirty minutes before they realised this fact, by which time most of them had died in the post-crash fire. Following the accident, the Royal Netherlands Air Force officer who commanded the Eindhoven airbase, the officer responsible for air traffic and the officer commanding the fire department were relieved of their duties. The investigation established that the passenger information, which was listed on the flight plan, was not transmitted to the destination airport; the investigation recommended that the flight plan procedure be amended.

Investigation
The cause of the accident was the ingestion of common starlings into the two left engines, which caused the plane to go out of control during landing.

References

External links
List of dead and survivors (in Dutch)
Aviation Safety Network page

Belgian air force hercules accident
Belgian air force hercules accident
Belgian air force hercules accident
Belgian air force hercules accident
July 1996 events in Europe